Psycadelik Thoughtz is the twelfth mixtape by American rapper B.o.B. The album was released on August 14, 2015, by Grand Hustle Records, Atlantic Records and Rebel Rock Entertainment. The song "Back and Forth" was released online a day before the album release.

Background
B.o.B described the project in a Twitter post, saying "To my fans: I've seen all of your messages, tweets, and instagram posts as I've been busy in the studio working on my album, but first...I want to release a very special project. This body of work is more than music, It's an experience!" B.o.B said he returned to his older persona of Bobby Ray, which he utilized on his mixtapes B.o.B vs. Bobby Ray (2009) and May 25th (2010), as well as his debut album B.o.B Presents: The Adventures of Bobby Ray (2010). In an interview with HipHopDX, B.o.B said: " It was a surprise project. It was a project where I wasn’t trying to reach anyone’s expectations or aim anywhere in particular. I wanted to do something that was cohesive. And, it all stands from "Back and Forth," the lead out single. I wanted to make something that could support it. It started off as being an EP and then grew into a whole project. I feel like this project is so special because the people have been asking for Bobby Ray and this is Bobby Ray in full form. At the same time, it’s the next step in getting me to where I’m going. I have to show people this. On my next album, it’s going to be even crazier. Not left so to speak but just what you’d expect from me."

Track listing

 signifies a co-producer.

Personnel
Credits for Psycadelik Thoughtz adapted from AllMusic

Jon Bellion — featured artist
B.o.B — primary artist
Soaky Siren — featured artist
Sevyn Streeter — featured artist

Charts

References

2015 albums
B.o.B albums
Albums produced by B.o.B
Grand Hustle Records albums
Atlantic Records albums